CSIR may refer to:

Organizations
 Council for Scientific and Industrial Research, an earlier name for the Commonwealth Scientific and Industrial Research Organisation, Australia
 Council for Scientific and Industrial Research – Ghana
 Council for Scientific and Industrial Research, South Africa
 Council of Scientific and Industrial Research, India
 Italian Expeditionary Corps in Russia, or Corpo di Spedizione Italiano in Russia

Technology
 Channel state information at the receiver

Medicine
 Cross-sectional Interventional radiology